"Body Talk" is a song by American band, the Deele. It was released as a single in January 1984 and peaked at number 77 on the Billboard Hot 100. It also reached the top ten on the R&B chart.

Chart positions

References

1984 singles
The Deele songs
Songs written by L.A. Reid
1983 songs
SOLAR Records singles